Crassispira lesbarritzensis is an extinct species of sea snail, a marine gastropod mollusk in the family Pseudomelatomidae, the turrids and allies.

Description
The length of the shell attains 11 mm.

Distribution
Fossils have been found in Oligocene and lower Miocene strata in Aquitaine, France

References

 Lozouet P. (2015). Nouvelles espèces de gastéropodes (Mollusca: Gastropoda) de l'Oligocène et du Miocène inférieur d'Aquitaine (Sud-Ouest de la France). Partie 5. Cossmanniana. 17: 15–84. page(s): 40, pl. 18 figs 9-12

lesbarritzensis
Gastropods described in 2015